Enrique Duarte Mungi (born 26 May 1938) is a Peruvian basketball player. He competed in the men's tournament at the 1964 Summer Olympics. Duarte's brothers, Luis, Raúl, and Ricardo were also professional basketball players. All four of them were during the 1964 Olympics.

References

External links
 

1938 births
Living people
Peruvian men's basketball players
1963 FIBA World Championship players
Olympic basketball players of Peru
Basketball players at the 1964 Summer Olympics
People from Junín Region
20th-century Peruvian people